Toner is a surname in English and Turkish. In English, it is an anglicisation of the Gaelic name Ó Tomhrair, meaning a "descendant of Tomhrar". Notable people with the surname include:

 Cole Toner (born 1994), American football player
 Devin Toner (born 1986), an Ireland rugby union international
 Fionnuala Toner, a Northern Ireland netball international
 Imogen Toner (born 1983), British actress and artist
 James J. Toner (born 1940), American racehorse trainer
 John Toner (1923–2014), American football coach
 Máire Toner, a Northern Ireland netball international
 Mehmet Toner (born 1958), Turkish biomedical engineer
 Michael E. Toner (born 1964), American lawyer
 Michael Toner (born 1944), British journalist
 Niall Toner (born 1944), Irish musician and radio broadcaster
 Pauline Toner (1935–1989), Australian politician
 Robin Toner (1954–2008), American journalist
 Tom Toner (1950–1990), American football player

See

Toney (name)

Tonner Patricia 

English-language surnames
Turkish-language surnames